PSP may refer to:

Organisations

Politics

Pak Sarzameen Party, a defunct political party in Pakistan
Pacifist Socialist Party (Dutch: Pacifistisch Socialistische Partij), a former Dutch political party
Partido Socialista Popular (Cuba)
People's Services Party, a political party in Vanuatu
Popular Socialist Party (Argentina), a former political party in Argentina
Popular Socialist Party, a post World War II Socialist Party of Chile
Popular Socialist Party (Haiti), a former communist political party in Haiti
Popular Socialist Party (Mexico) (PPS), a communist party in Mexico
Popular Socialist Party (Spain), a former Spanish political party that has merged with the Spanish Socialist Workers' Party (PSOE)
Praja Socialist Party, a former Indian political party
Progress Singapore Party, a political party in Singapore
Progressive Socialist Party (al-hizb al-taqadummi al-ishtiraki), a political party in Lebanon
Progressive Socialist Party of Ukraine (Prohresivna Sotsjalistychna Partiya Ukrayiny), a political party in Ukraine
Progressive Sudanese Party, a former political party in French Sudan (now Mali)
Puerto Rican Socialist Party, a former  political party in Puerto Rico

Education

Pittsburgh Scholars Program of the Perry Traditional Academy, Pennsylvania, US
Professional School of Psychology, Sacramento, California, US

Government

Państwowa Straż Pożarna, State Fire Service in Poland
Pennsylvania State Police, US
Polícia de Segurança Pública (Public Security Police), Portugal
Public Sector Pension Investment Board

Computing
PlayStation Portable, Sony handheld game console
PaintShop Pro, a graphics editor
Parallel slave port on some PIC microcontrollers
Personal software process, to improve programming quality
Program Segment Prefix, used in DOS systems to store the state of a program
Python Server Pages, for embedding Python in HTML
AMD Platform Security Processor

Engineering
Pierced steel planking
Pneumatic stabilized platform, for large floating structures

Firearms
Heckler & Koch P7, also known as PSP, "Police Self-loading Pistol"
Plated Soft Point, and Pointed Soft Point, types of bullet

Science and medicine
Paralytic shellfish poisoning
Parker Solar Probe
Pathological skin picking
Phenolsulfonphthalein (phenol red), a pH indicator
Photostimulable phosphor plate, or image plate, recording X-rays
Polydiethylstilbestrol phosphate, a nonsteroidal estrogen
Polysaccharide peptide, a protein-bound sugar polymer
Postsynaptic potential, the voltage of nerves
Pressure-sensitive paint
Progressive supranuclear palsy of the brain, a degenerative disease
Pseudoprime, a non-prime which passes a probabilistic primality test

Other
Palm Springs International Airport, IATA airport code
Payment service provider
Personal Public Service Number (Irish: Uimhir Phearsanta Seirbhíse Poiblí, or Uimh. PSP), Ireland
Philippine Sign Language, by ISO 639-3 language code
Physical Security Professional
Planning and Scheduling Professional, a certification of AACE International
President's Surveillance Program, US

See also